DAAS Kapital is an Australian television comedy series written by and starring comedy trio the Doug Anthony All Stars (Paul McDermott, Tim Ferguson and Richard Fidler) with supporting cast members Paul Livingston, Michael Petroni, Bob Downe and Khym Lam. The title is a reference to the trio's acronym "DAAS" and Karl Marx's economic treatise Das Kapital.

The series premiered on 15 July 1991, in Australia on the ABC network, and the season finale aired 7 July 1992. DAAS Kapital aired in 18 countries including Japan, Britain, USA and Germany and was released on DVD 20 March 2013 with commentary by the All Stars and a new, original song. On 13 April 2013, the All Stars reunited for a one-off show celebrating the launch of the DVD set.

Format
DAAS Kapital was a sitcom that incorporated sketch show and variety show TV formats. For example, in each scripted episode, there would be cutaways to television shows and commercials—typically Shitsu Tonka News, Troy The Invincible and Wayne Kerr—along with guest appearances by Paul Livingston, Bob, Bob Downe and stop-motion animation sequences, along with original songs performed by the Doug Anthony All Stars. Ferguson described the show as "a cross between Land of Giants, Marine Boy and Jacques Cousteau on speed." Each episode's plot usually consisted of a very simple idea, such as a bug infestation on board or a Cinderella-style story mixed with all the above segments strung together with very quick jokes, narrative humour and stories told by the All Stars.

Characters and casting
In addition to Tim, Paul and Richard, numerous other recurring characters appeared throughout the series. These included:
 Flacco (Paul Livingston): a strange alien being with a high-pitched voice. He spends most of his time talking to his pet (animated) cockroach, Ross. Livingston also portrays several other characters throughout the series, such as the Marquis de Sade and the Pope, although the other characters have Flacco's mannerisms.
 Psycho Bob (Michael Petroni): an American serial killer and psychotic who has somehow stowed away on board. He usually has a ranting monologue to camera ending with his catchphrase: "I'm Bob, and I'll be back." Tim is the only member of the crew to have seen or encountered him, implying that he is a figment of Tim's subconscious.
 Thulgore (animated): a giant monster (said to be a crab louse, but with anthropomorphic face and limbs) who lives in the engine room.
 The Shitsu Tonka newsreader (Khym Lam): the boys' only contact with the outside world is broadcasts from Shitsu Tonka's television network, including regular bulletins from a female Asian newsreader.
 Bob Downe (Mark Trevorrow): a cheesy cabaret singer who is a TV personality on Shitsu Tonka.
 Wayne Kerr (Tim Ferguson): along with his sidekick pals, Spinner (Richard Fidler) and Paddlefoot (Paul McDermott), are characters in the most violent program on Shitsu Tonka ("with a G-5 violence rating!").
 Troy the Invincible (Paul McDermott): appears on Shitsu Tonka. Performs acts of violence on himself to demonstrate the invincibility of his working-class principles.
 Uncle Biff Happy (Richard Fidler): a used car salesman whose ads appear on Shitsu Tonka.

Scenario
By the year 1998, the Shitsu Tonka Unitocracy has taken over the world. "Competition between nations has been made redundant by the universal 'Common Cents' currency and rezoning and decentralisation of much of the world's population. By homogenising the various races of the world, the petty nationalism that has plagued civilisation since the Dawn of Man has been diffused ... all [minorities] are allowed to flourish in the macrosociety we have imposed."

The show itself takes place in the year 2006 as the All Stars (Tim Ferguson, Paul McDermott and Richard Fidler) are placed in a submarine with all the world's artwork and treasures and their "assignment is to catalogue history." Some time later they become lost, their whereabouts unknown and their existence is denied by the Shitsu Tonka Corp.

In the final episode of season 1, it becomes apparent that Shitsu Tonka deliberately sabotaged the ship, placing Richard on board as a robot implanted with a bomb. He was to self-destruct and completely destroy history. Instead, the blast propelled the submarine into space, providing an opportunity for more sci-fi based storylines and parodies in the show's second season. In the final episode of this season, the ship returns to the ocean.

Episodes

Season 1 (1991) 
All episodes are named after the seven deadly sins.

The episodes listed in the Season 1 scriptbook are in this order: Avarice, Sloth, Gluttony, Pride, Envy, Lust, Anger. Episodes in broadcast order below.

* "Gluttony" opens with the All Stars performing a cover of The Velvet Underground's "Sunday Morning." On the 2013 DAAS Kapital DVD, the song is omitted due to "contractual reasons... and because we never paid to use it in the first place," according to Paul McDermott. In its place is the song "Saturday (mourning)," also known as Saturday's The Day For Leaving," written and recorded exclusively for the DVD release. During the song, the DVD displays text to this effect, before mentioning the All Stars' performance of Sunday Morning "is still on YouTube".

Season 2 (1992) 
All episodes are named after the seven heavenly virtues.

Home media

Scriptbook 
In 1992, the scripts for the first season of DAAS Kapital were collected into a book which also contained on-set photographs of the production and illustrations by the All Stars.

DVD  

On 1 November 2012, Tim Ferguson announced via Twitter that a DAAS Kapital DVD was underway and would be released in 2013. Ferguson then tweeted that the set would include audio commentary followed by a picture of the recording session, one of the DAAS Kapital crew as they are today and revealing that a new, original song was being recorded for the DVD set.

The DVD was confirmed for release on 20 March 2013, with the group reforming for the official launch of the DVD set on 13 April. After lengthy discussion on the DVD set itself, the show and guests Flacco, Khym Lam and producer/co-director Ted Robinson, DAAS performed three songs: "My Girl" (the first song they performed together as a group), "Warsong" from DAAS Kapital and the last song the group recorded, the DVD exclusive "Saturday's The Day For Leaving."

References

External links 
 

1991 Australian television series debuts
1992 Australian television series endings
Australian Broadcasting Corporation original programming
Australian comedy television series
Television series set in 2006
Television series set in the future
Seven deadly sins in popular culture